Ben Pentreath is an English architectural and interior designer who runs Ben Pentreath Ltd, an RIBA chartered practice. He is responsible for much of the development since 2009 of Poundbury. He has also done other work for the Duchy of Cornwall, including a development in Truro. Country Life magazine called him one of the "best country house architects in Britain".

As an interior designer, he has worked for Catherine, Duchess of Cambridge on the refurbishment of Anmer Hall.

He also runs Pentreath & Hall, which sells home furnishings.

Books

References

External links
Official website
Pentreath & Hall

Year of birth missing (living people)
Living people
21st-century English architects
New Classical architects
Driehaus Architecture Prize winners
English interior designers